Atlantic Coast may refer to:

 Any coast facing the Atlantic Ocean

Regions 
 East Coast of the United States
 Gulf Coast of the United States
 Caribbean region of Colombia
 Atlantic Canada
 Argentine Basin

Sports 
 Atlantic Coast Conference, a collegiate athletic conference on the Atlantic Coast of the United States
 Atlantic Coast League, a high school athletic conference in Massachusetts

Transport 
Atlantic Coast Airlines, an airline in the United States
Atlantic Coast Express, a former express passenger train in England

See also
Atlantic Coast Line (disambiguation)
Atlantic Coast restingas, Brazil
Atlantic Coastal Plain, USA
Indian Ocean
Arctic Ocean